
Gmina Polska Cerekiew, German Gemeinde Groß Neukirch is a rural gmina (administrative district) in Kędzierzyn-Koźle County, Opole Voivodeship, in south-western Poland.

Since 2011 the commune has been bilingual in German and Polish, and has its signs in two languages. These signs celebrate the multicultural past of the region, which was prior to 1945 part of Germany and still maintains a large German population.

Administrative divisions
The commune contains the villages and settlements of:

Polska Cerekiew
Ciężkowice
Dzielawy
Grzędzin
Jaborowice
Koza
Łaniec
Ligota Mała
Mierzęcin
Połowa
Witosławice
Wronin
Zakrzów

Neighbouring gminas
Gmina Polska Cerekiew is bordered by the gminas of Baborów and Rudnik.

Twin towns – sister cities

Gmina Polska Cerekiew is twinned with:
 Rieste, Germany
 Světlá Hora, Czech Republic

Gallery

References

Polska Cerekiew
Kędzierzyn-Koźle County